Muhammad Salih Mustafa is the Party President and General Emir of the Islamic Party of Kurdistan (PIK), a Kurdish, militant Islamist group, fighting to establish an Islamic State of Kurdistan in South-Eastern Turkey.

See also
Hüseyin Velioğlu
Mullah Krekar

References

Year of birth missing (living people)
Living people
Kurdish Muslims
Place of birth missing (living people)